Marie Joseph Anatole Élie de Riquet et de Caraman, 19th Prince de Chimay (4 July 1858 – 25 July 1937), known as Joseph de Caraman-Chimay, the younger, was a Belgian aristocrat and fencer. He was titled "Prince de Chimay" from 1892 until his death in 1937.

Early life
He was born to Joseph de Riquet, Prince de Chimay and Prince de Caraman (of Belgium), and Marie Joséphine Anatole de Montesquiou-Fézensac. Named for its Belgian "château de Chimay", his family was noted for its patronage of music and the arts. One of his sisters was Élisabeth de Riquet de Caraman-Chimay, the Countess Greffulhe.

Career
The Prince de Chimay was a competitor in the individual épée event at the 1900 Summer Olympics.

Personal life
On 19 May 1890 he married Clara Ward, a sixteen-year-old American heiress.

 Marie Anatole Catherine Elisabeth, Comtesse de Caraman-Chimay (1891–1939), who married Georges De Cocq in 1918
 Joseph Marie Pierre Anatole Alphonse de Riquet (1894–1920)

They were divorced on 19 January 1897, after Clara's widely publicized elopement with a gypsy violinist. By a second marriage to Anne Marie Charlotte Amélie Gilone Le Veneur de Tillières (1889–1962) on 24 June 1920, he had two more children:

 Joseph Marie Alexandre Pierre Ghislain, 20th Prince de Chimay, Prince de Caraman (1921–1990), who resigned the princely title to his brother upon becoming a U.S. citizen; married Germaine Hélène Jeanne van der Meulen in 1946, but died without issue
 Élie Marie Charles Pierre Paul, 21st Prince de Chimay, Prince de Caraman (1924–1980), who married Marie Elisabeth Marthe Antoine Manset in 1947 and had issue.

The Prince de Chimay died on 25 July 1937 in Chimay, Hainaut, Belgium.

References

External links
 

1858 births
1937 deaths
Joseph
Fencers at the 1900 Summer Olympics
French male épée fencers
Olympic fencers of France
Fencers from Paris
Royal Olympic participants